This is a list of European colonial administrators responsible for the territory of Spanish Sahara, an area equivalent to modern-day Western Sahara.

List

(Dates in italics indicate de facto continuation of office)

See also
 International Court of Justice Advisory Opinion on Western Sahara
 History of Western Sahara
 Saharan Liberation Army
 Southern Provinces
 Tiris al-Gharbiyya
 Sahrawi Arab Democratic Republic
 Polisario Front
 Spanish protectorate in Morocco
 List of Spanish high commissioners in Morocco

References

External links
 World Statesmen – Western Sahara

History of Western Sahara
Sahara
Spanish Sahara
Colonial governors